Women's Christian College is an interdenominational women's college on College Road, Nungambakkam, in Chennai, Tamil Nadu, India.

History
The Women's Christian College was founded in 1915 with 41 students and 7 faculty members, as a result of the joint venture of 12 missionary societies of interdenominational and international nature located in England, in Canada and in U.S.A., with a mission to provide higher education to women of India in liberal arts and sciences. It was affiliated to the University of Madras and was given recognition as an autonomous college in 1982. At present it is a government-aided minority institution. It has grown to a strength of over 4252 students and 209 members of faculty in the aided and self-financing sections.

India's first female political prisoner and freedom fighter Rukmani Lakshmipathy was a first batch student.

Principals

 Eleanor McDougall, 
 Eleanor Rivett, 1938–1947
 Elizabeth George, 1947–1950
 Eleanor D. Mason, 1950–1956
 Renuka Mukerji, 1956–1965
 Anna T. Zachariah, 1965–1971
 Renuka Somasekhar, 1971–1981
 Indrani Michael, 1981–1994
 Kanmani Christian, 1994–1998
 Glory Christopher, 1998–2003
 Rita Jacob Cherian, 2003–2006
 Ridling Margaret Waller 2006-2017
 Lilian I Jasper 2017- Present

Sister college

Mount Holyoke College in South Hadley, Massachusetts, U.S., has been Women's Christian College's sister college since 1920. Both Mount Holyoke Culturals and Mount Holyoke Hostel (dormitory) at Women's Christian College refer to this.

Rankings

The college was ranked 72 among colleges in India by National Institutional Ranking Framework (NIRF) in 2022

Notable alumni
 Megha Akash, actress
 Subhashini Ali, politician
 Regina Cassandra, actress and model
 Andrea Jeremiah, singer and actress
 Anaswara Kumar, actress
 Rukmini Lakshmipathi, freedom fighter and first women minister in Madras Presidency
 M. Sarada Menon, psychiatrist and Padma Bhushan awardee
 Reshmi Menon, actress
 Sonajharia Minz, vice-chancellor at Sido Kanhu Murmu University
 C. B. Muthamma, India's first woman civil servant
 Shoba Narayan, journalist
 Thangam Philip, nutritionist and Padma Shri awardee
 Saranya Ponvannan, actress
 Heera Rajagopal, actress
 Latika Saran, Commissioner of Police for Greater Chennai
 Mallika Srinivasan, industrialist
 Roopa Unnikrishnan, sports shooter
 Vibha Batra, author, poet, adperson
 Sudha Kongara Prasad, director.

References

External links

 Official website

 
University of Madras
Mount Holyoke College
Christian universities and colleges in India
Women's universities and colleges in Chennai
Educational institutions established in 1915
1915 establishments in India
Colleges affiliated to University of Madras